Lumë (also called Lum and Lumi) is a village in the former Shtiqën Municipality, Kukës County, Albania. At the 2015 local government reform it became part of the municipality Kukës.

It is part of the Lumë region. According to Johann Georg von Hahn, both the village and the region take the name from the Lumë stream.

Notes

Populated places in Kukës
Villages in Kukës County